George Ratcliffe may refer to:
 George Ratcliffe (footballer) (1876–1944), English footballer
 George Ratcliffe (cricketer, born 1856) (1856–1928), English cricketer
 George Ratcliffe (cricketer, born 1882) (1882–1949), English cricketer
 George Ratcliffe Woodward (1848–1934), English composer

See also
 George Radcliffe (disambiguation)